Rolls-Royce Tay is the name of two different jet engines:
Rolls-Royce RB.44 Tay, an afterburning turbojet engine, based on the 1940s Rolls-Royce Nene
Rolls-Royce RB.183 Tay, a twin-spool high bypass turbofan engine, first run in 1984